This is a list of people who have been, or are currently, banned in Australia.

Currently banned

Previously banned

References 

Australia
Banned
People banned from entering
Banned from entering Australia
Australia
People banned from entering